Evangelist portraits are a specific type of miniature included in ancient and mediaeval illuminated manuscript Gospel Books, and later in Bibles and other books, as well as other media. Each Gospel of the Four Evangelists, the books of Matthew, Mark, Luke, and John, may be prefaced by a portrait of the Evangelist, usually occupying a full page.  Their symbols  may be shown with them, or separately.  Often they are the only figurative illumination in the manuscript.  They are a common feature in larger Gospel Books from the earliest examples in the 6th century until the decline of that format for illustrated books in the High Middle Ages, by which time their conventions were being used for portraits of other authors.

Author portraits
They originate in the classical secular tradition of the author portrait, which was often the only illustration in a classical manuscript, also used as a frontispiece (not unlike the contemporary author photo, though this is usually shown on the back cover or wrapper). A very few examples of Late Antique secular author portraits survive, and rather more later copies.  Some examples also draw on the conventions of the Late Antique consular portrait, much used for the Emperors, who were also consuls.  Examples of these, copied from the original, can be seen in the Chronography of 354 (see also the Missorium of Theodosius I of 30 years later).  The Evangelist may be holding a book, but is not writing in it, and he faces the front on a large throne, surrounded by an elaborate frame, usually domed or pedimented.  These frameworks are thought to draw from the style of the Scaenae frons, or elaborate proscenium structures of Roman theatres.

Evangelists' symbols

The traditional symbols of the Evangelists were often included in the images, or especially in the Insular tradition, either given their own additional images on a separate page, or used instead of an evangelist portrait.  The symbols are: the Lion of Mark, the Eagle of John, the Ox or Calf of Luke and the Angel or Man of Matthew.  Often all are shown with wings, as in the familiar winged lion used in the coat of arms of Venice, whose patron saint was Mark.  Sometimes, as in the example from Lorsch, the symbols are shown dictating the text to the evangelist.

The symbols of the four evangelists are derived from a vision in the book of the Old Testament prophet Ezekiel of four living creatures in the form of men, but each with four faces:

"As for the likeness of their faces, each had the face of a man in front; the four had the face of a lion on the right side, the four had the face of an ox on the left side, and the four had the face of an eagle at the back." (Ezek. 1:10)

Christian iconographic tradition came to associate the man with Saint Matthew, the lion with Saint Mark, the ox with Saint Luke, and the eagle with Saint John.

Depictions and other media
Late Antique evangelist portraits often show standing figures, as in the ivory panels of the Throne of Maximianus in Milan, but from the Insular art of the 7th to 10th centuries, evangelist portraits in manuscripts nearly always closely followed the seated classical models, showing the Evangelists at full-length, either looking out at the viewer or writing at a table or desk and seen at an oblique angle.  These were derived from unknown classical prototypes, similar to those in the Codex Amiatinus and Saint Augustine Gospels, though both of these types are rather different from the general types.  Usually a setting is provided for the figure.  Details of the classical models, such as anachronistic scrolls and scroll-boxes, and a small writing-stand with a single dolphin-shaped support (see gallery below), survive well into the Middle Ages, sometimes clearly misunderstood by the artists concerned. Perhaps because of the secular origins of the typology, haloes are less likely to be worn than in other types of image.  The level of detail shown in the furniture and fittings is unusual for Early Medieval art.  An arch behind the author, often with curtains hanging across it, in some examples close to the classical models, gradually is turned into a decorative framing device for the whole scene.

Early Gospel Books often had a very elaborate and costly treasure binding or cover in metalwork, often with jewels and ivories.  These most often featured a central panel with Christ in Majesty, often including the Evangelists and/or their symbols in the corners.  Versions of the same composition appear in all media used for Early Medieval religious art, including wall paintings.  The Tassilo Chalice is an 8th-century example of pure metalwork with five oval medallion portraits of Christ and the Evangelists (with symbols) round the cup.

Insular variants and decline

The early artists of the Insular period often show evangelists from the front who appear to be standing, although a chair is drawn behind them; the human figure was not a focus of interest or skill for these artists.  Later Insular depictions seem to show figures without chairs, who are standing.  Most of Europe continued to use the seated model however, usually seen in a three-quarters on view, and usually with a cushion behind.  Sometimes all four evangelists were combined on a page, sometimes around a Christ in Majesty.  Standing portraits were usual, however, for wall and later panel paintings (and in the Tree of Jesse composition) with the Evangelists often treated as, and mixed with, other saints.  
 
The Gospel book as a medium for heavily illustrated manuscripts declined in the West from the Romanesque period, and with it the use of the Evangelist portrait. In the Eastern Orthodox world, the Gospel Book remained a primary focus for illumination, and Evangelist portraits, derived from contemporary Byzantine versions, are heavily represented among the earliest illuminations from the new Slav national traditions, such as the 11th-century Ostromir Gospels and the Khitrovo Gospels of about 1390 from Muscovy.   In the West the portraits continued to be found in Bibles, more often as the picture within a historiated initial at the start of each Gospel.  Other books sometimes contained them as well.  Similar compositions began to be used for other saint-authors, especially for St Jerome, who is often shown in a book-lined study, often with his symbol, a lion, dozing at his feet. Similarly St Gregory the Great may be shown with a dove, representing his inspiration from the Holy Spirit, whispering in his ear.

Gallery

Notes

References

Calkins, Robert G. Illuminated Books of the Middle Ages. Ithaca, New York: Cornell University Press, 1983.
Nordenfalk, Carl. Cetic and Anglo-Saxon Painting: Book illumination in the British Isles 600-800. New York: George Braziller, 1977.
Otto Pächt, Book Illumination in the Middle Ages (trans fr German), 1986, Harvey Miller Publishers, London, 

Christian art
Christian iconography
Iconography of illuminated manuscripts
Art depicting New Testament people